Bartonia is a genus of the gentian family, tribe Gentianeae, subtribe Swertiinae. Members of this genus are called screwstems.  Bartonia was also the name of a genus in the Loasaceae family, but those species are now generally classified under the genus Mentzelia.

, Kew's Plants of the World Online accepts three species of Bartonia:
Bartonia paniculata 
Bartonia verna 
Bartonia virginica

References

Gentianaceae
Gentianaceae genera
Taxa named by Gotthilf Heinrich Ernst Muhlenberg